The 1992 Algerian Super Cup is the  2nd edition of Algerian Super Cup, a football match contested by the winners of the Championnat National and 1991–92 Algerian Cup competitions. The match was scheduled to be played on 1 November 1992 at Stade 5 Juillet 1962 in Algiers between 1991–92 Championnat National winners MC Oran and 1991–92 Algerian Cup winners JS Kabylie.

Match details

See also
 1991–92 Algerian Championnat National
 1991–92 Algerian Cup

References

External links
Algeria - List of Cup Finals - rsssf.com

1992
Supercup